Drymen railway station served the village of Croftamie, Stirling, Scotland, from 1856 to 1934 on the Forth and Clyde Junction Railway.

History 
The station was opened on 26 May 1856 by the Forth and Clyde Junction Railway. The station building was on the eastbound platform and the goods yard was served from the east. The station closed on 1 October 1934. The nearby signal box was reduced to a signal box after closure. The station building and the goods shed survives today.

References

External links
RailScot

Disused railway stations in Stirlingshire
Railway stations in Great Britain opened in 1856
Railway stations in Great Britain closed in 1934
1856 establishments in Scotland
1934 disestablishments in Scotland